In molecular biology mir-589 microRNA is a short RNA molecule. MicroRNAs function to regulate the expression levels of other genes by several mechanisms.

Molecular targets
miR-589 has been implicated in the regulation of antimicrobial targets in bovine lung alveolar macrophages, and alongside other miRNAs has been suggested to play a part in the immune response against Mycobacterium tuberculosis. It has additionally been linked to HLA-G expression, having been found to target the 3'UTR 14-base pair sequence region of the HLA-G gene.

See also 
 MicroRNA

References

External links
 

MicroRNA
MicroRNA precursor families